The 2000 AFC Youth Championship qualifying competition is a men's under-19 football competition that determined the nine teams joining the automatically qualified hosts Iran in the 2000 AFC Youth Championship final tournament.

A total of 39 AFC member national teams entered the qualifying competition. Players born on or after 1 January 1981 were eligible to participate.

Group stage

Group 1

References

AFC U-19 Championship qualification
2000 in Asian football
2000 in youth association football